Yakuhananomia polyspila is a species of beetle in the genus Yakuhananomia of the family Mordellidae. It was described in 1897.

References

Mordellidae
Beetles described in 1897